Michael Dahl Andersen (born 29 January 1974), is a retired Danish professional  basketball player. He is 2.13 m (7'0") in height and he plays at the position of center.

Honours

Prokom Sopot
 2-time Polish League championship as a player for Prokom Sopot: (2006, 2007)

References

External links
Player Profile - AEK.com
LegaBasket Stats 

1974 births
Living people
AEK B.C. players
Danish men's basketball players
Danish expatriate basketball people in the United States
Danish expatriate basketball people in Poland
Danish expatriate basketball people in Italy
Peristeri B.C. players
Asseco Gdynia players
Rhode Island Rams men's basketball players
Scafati Basket players
Sportspeople from Copenhagen
Virtus Bologna players
Centers (basketball)
Danish expatriate basketball people in Greece